Fields of Fire is a solitaire tactical wargame published by GMT Games that is designed to simulate various historical campaigns of wars between World War II and now. The game is card based with two decks used to play, including a terrain deck and action decks.  You must build maps for missions and then use turn-based strategic actions. A single game consists of several missions from a historical campaign and each of these individual missions can be played in about 3 – 5 hours.  It has won Games Magazine's award for Best New Historical Simulation Game in their 2010 Games 100 issue.

According to the manufacturer,
This game is based on three actual campaigns experienced by units of the 9th US Infantry (Regiment) in World War II, Korea, and Vietnam. “Keep Up the Fire” is the motto of the 9th Infantry (Regiment), known as the “Manchus” for their service in the Boxer Rebellion.

A second edition was published in 2017.

References

External links
 GMT Games' Fields of Fire homepage
 GMT Games' Project 500 Fields of Fire page
 
 Fields of Fire Boot Camp  - Rules reference site

Board games introduced in 2008
Board games about history
Tactical wargames
GMT Games games